David Primo (born 5 May 1946 in Bulgaria) is a former Israeli international footballer who was part of the squad that competed at the 1970 World Cup, Israel's only world cup appearance.

External links
NASL career stats

1946 births
Living people
Israeli Jews
Israeli footballers
Association football midfielders
Hapoel Tel Aviv F.C. players
Baltimore Bays players
New York Cosmos players
Hapoel Ramat Gan F.C. players
Liga Leumit players
Israel international footballers
1964 AFC Asian Cup players
1970 FIFA World Cup players
National Professional Soccer League (1967) players
North American Soccer League (1968–1984) players
Israeli expatriate footballers
Expatriate soccer players in the United States
Israeli expatriate sportspeople in the United States
Footballers from Jaffa
Bulgarian Jews in Israel
Bulgarian emigrants to Israel